H2 (formerly History International) was an American specialty television channel that was owned by A+E Networks (a joint venture between the Hearst Corporation and the Disney–ABC Television Group), available on multi-channel television providers.

Launching in 1998 as History International, a spin-off of the History Channel focused on international history, it re-launched as H2 in September 2011, primarily carrying reruns of documentary programming previously seen on its parent network from the mid-2000s onward, original historical and popular science documentaries, and pseudoscientific entertainment programs. The channel ceased operations on February 29, 2016 and was subsequently replaced by Viceland.

History
The network launched on November 16, 1998 as History Channel International (abbreviated as "HI" or variations on "H-INT"). It originally focused mainly on programs and specials focusing on world history. History International occasionally featured shows in languages other than English, such as French or Spanish for use with the National Cable & Telecommunications Association's Cable in the Classroom initiative. By 2010, this was reduced to an hour-long Spanish language program on weekday mornings titled  (the English translation of The History Channel).

On September 26, 2011, the network was rebranded as H2, with its programming being refocused to feature documentary content from sister network History prior to that network's shift towards more reality programming, along with original programs (such as the special The Universe: Beyond the Big Bang and the first-run series America's Book of Secrets), as well as exclusive new episodes of the former History series The Universe, Ancient Aliens and Modern Marvels, in addition to international-focused programming. H2 did not have plans to add reality series as its sister channel has done. Newer documentaries more recently seen on History migrated to the network as part of the rebrand, which would rotate with the documentaries from History International that primarily span from the mid-1990s to the mid-2000s.

In August 2014, A&E Networks acquired a 10% stake in Vice Media, and on November 3, 2015, A&E announced that H2 would be "replaced" by Viceland, a new lifestyle-focused network programmed by Vice Media. H2 signed off on February 29, 2016 at 6:00 a.m. ET, being replaced by pre-launch programming for Viceland.

Availability
, H2 was available to 70.1 million households in the United States.

See also
 List of programs broadcast by History (TV network)
 Viceland (U.S. TV channel)

References

A&E Networks
Television channels and stations established in 1998
Television channels and stations disestablished in 2016
Defunct television networks in the United States